A chorale cantata is a church cantata based on a chorale—in this context a Lutheran chorale. It is principally from the German Baroque era. The organizing principle is the words and music of a Lutheran hymn. Usually a chorale cantata includes multiple movements or parts.  Most chorale cantatas were written between approximately 1650 and 1750. By far the most famous are by Johann Sebastian Bach, especially the cantatas composed in his second annual cycle of cantatas, started in Leipzig in 1724.

Description

The chorale cantata developed out of the chorale concerto, an earlier form much used by Samuel Scheidt in the early 17th century, which incorporated elements of the Venetian School, such as the concertato style, into the liturgical music of the Protestant Reformation.  Later the chorale cantata developed into three general forms:
 a form in which each verse (strophe) of the chorale was developed as an independent movement;
 a form in which the chorale appeared in some of the movements, perhaps only two, while the other parts of the cantata used other texts; and
 the version pioneered by J. S. Bach, in which the first and last movements use the first and last strophes of the chorale, but the inner movements—perhaps aria and recitative—use paraphrases of the chorale text. Typically the beginning and ending movements use all the instrumental and vocal forces, while the interior movements are for smaller groups.

Most compositions in this genre were never published. It was common at the time for composers to write for local performances; often the composer and the music director at a church were the same person, and the music was written, copied and performed in short order, remaining in manuscript.  Some 95% of all compositions of this type have been lost.

Composers

Composers of chorale cantatas include:

Baroque

Samuel Scheidt
Johann Andreas Herbst
Johann Erasmus Kindermann
Franz Tunder
Nicolaus Bruhns
Dieterich Buxtehude
Johann Krieger
Sebastian Knüpfer
Johann Schelle
Johann Pachelbel, e.g. his sacred concerto Christ lag in Todesbanden, P 60, with one movement for each of the "Christ lag in Todesbanden" hymn's seven stanzas.
Johann Rosenmüller
Johannes Crüger
Joachim Gerstenbüttel
Georg Bronner
Christoph Graupner
Johann Kuhnau
Georg Philipp Telemann
Johann Sebastian Bach

Post-Baroque

Felix Mendelssohn (Verleih uns Frieden, Vom Himmel hoch)
Arnold Mendelssohn

References

 Articles "Chorale cantata", "Chorale settings", in The New Grove Dictionary of Music and Musicians, ed. Stanley Sadie.  20 vol.  London, Macmillan Publishers Ltd., 1980.  
 Manfred Bukofzer, Music in the Baroque Era.  New York, W.W. Norton & Co., 1947.  

German music history
Baroque music
Classical church music